(born 1952) is a jazz guitarist born in Japan and currently based in Sapporo, Japan. His playing style incorporates bebop, hard bop, and jazz fusion. He recorded several albums as a leader for Muse and Enja in the late 1980s and early 1990s.

Discography
 Akio with Joe Henderson (Muse, 1988) – with Joe Henderson
 Time Remembered (Muse, 1989)
 Humpty Dumpty (BRC, 1990) – with Joe Henderson
 Akioustically Sound (Muse, 1991)
 Time Remembered (Muse, 1993)
 Akioustically Sound (Muse, 1995) – with Ron Carter
 Two for the Muse (Pony Canyon, 2006)
 Images Of Lennon/McCartney (Tonegold, 2015)

References

1952 births
Living people
Japanese jazz guitarists
Muse Records artists
Enja Records artists
Date of birth missing (living people)